James Muller is an Australian jazz guitarist. The James Muller Trio won the 2000 ARIA Award for Best Jazz Album with the album All Out. Muller was nominated for same award in 2002 with Thrum and in 2006 with Kaboom.

Discography

Albums

Awards

ARIA Music Awards
The ARIA Music Awards is an annual awards ceremony that recognises excellence, innovation, and achievement across all genres of the music of Australia.

! 
|-
| 2000
|All Out (as James Muller Trio)
| Best Jazz Album
| 
|rowspan="3"| 
|-
| 2002
|Thrum 
| Best Jazz Album
| 
|-
| 2006
|Kaboom 
| Best Jazz Album
| 
|-

Freedman Jazz Fellowship
This award is offered each year to young Australian musicians to enable them to execute a particular project.

Mo Awards
The Australian Entertainment Mo Awards (commonly known informally as the Mo Awards), were annual Australian entertainment industry awards. They recognise achievements in live entertainment in Australia from 1975 to 2016. James Muller won two awards in that time.
 (wins only)
|-
|rowspan="2"|  2000
| James Muller
| Jazz Instrumental Performer of the Year
| 
|-
| James Muller Trio
| Jazz Group of the Year
| 
|-

References

Australian jazz guitarists
ARIA Award winners
Living people
Year of birth missing (living people)